Kosinski may refer to:

 Kosiński uprising (1591–1593), two rebellions in the Polish-Lithuanian Commonwealth
 Kosinski, a recurring Star Trek: The Next Generation character who premiered in "Where No One Has Gone Before"
 "Kosinski", a song by Angels of Light from the album Everything Is Good Here/Please Come Home

People
 Izidoro Kosinski (1932–2017), Roman Catholic bishop
 Krzysztof Kosiński (1545–1593), Cossack noble from the Podlachia region
 Richard Kosinski, keyboard player
 Michal Kosinski, Computational Psychologist, Professor at Stanford University

Americans
 Alexandra Kosinski (born 1989), American distance-runner
 Dorothy Kosinski, American scholar of nineteenth and twentieth-century art
 Gerard Kosinski (born 1954), former Democratic member of the Pennsylvania House of Representatives
 Jerzy Kosiński (1933–1991), Polish-American novelist
 Joseph Kosinski (born 1974), American television commercial and feature film director
 Michelle Kosinski (born 1974), Emmy award-winning American journalist
 Norbert A. Kosinski (1918–1978), American politician
 Robert E. Kosienski, Sr (Kosiński) (1934-], American Chief of Police, Polish American Historian
 Robert E. Kosienski, Jr (Kosiński) (1969-), American Educator, Longest serving member of a Board of Education in Connecticut's history
 Michal Kosinski (1982-), Professor at Stanford University

Poles
 Cezary Kosiński (born 1973), Polish actor
 Ryszard Kosiński (1955–2010), Polish sprint canoer
 Waldemar Kosiński (born 1965), Polish weightlifter
 Witold Kosiński (1946–2014), Polish mathematician and computer scientist

See also
 Kosinsky (disambiguation)